Hyloconis is a genus of moths in the family Gracillariidae. The type species is Hyloconis puerariae.

Species
Hyloconis bicruris Bai & Li, 2012
Hyloconis desmodii Kumata, 1963
Hyloconis improvisella (Ermolaev, 1986)
Hyloconis lespedezae Kumata, 1963
Hyloconis luki De Prins, 2012
Hyloconis luminata Bai & Li, 2012
Hyloconis puerariae Kumata, 1963
Hyloconis wisteriae Kumata, 1963

References

External links
Global Taxonomic Database of Gracillariidae (Lepidoptera) 

Lithocolletinae
Gracillarioidea genera

Taxa named by Tosio Kumata